Cryptocoryne wendtii, the Wendt's water trumpet, is a species of herb which is a popular aquarium plant which is native to Sri Lanka.  It was described by Dutch botanist Hendrik de Wit in honour of aquarium hobbyist and writer Albert Wendt.

Distribution
It is native to Sri Lanka and has been introduced into Florida.

Description
A very variable species and numerous 'forms' of variable taxonomic status have been discussed, for example "Tropica". The "Mi Oya" form is named after the river it is found in Sri Lanka.

Cultivation
An easy plant to grow and one of the most robust Cryptocoryne species, it is common and widely found in the aquarium trade. It is variable under different light and other environmental conditions. It is propagated by runners.

Sources
 Dötsch, A. 1984. Cryptocoryne wendtii de Wit (Pflanzenportrait). Aqua-Planta 3-84 : 17-18.
 Jacobsen, N. 1987. Cryptocoryne. A Revised Handbook to the Flora of Ceylon, Vol. VI: 85-99.
 Möhlmann, F. 1985. Reich an Varianten ist Cryptocoryne wendtii De Wit. Das Aquarium 198 : 629-633.
 Möhlmann, F. 1994. Die Cryptocoryne-Arten Ceylons (2). Aqua-Planta 1-94 : 34-39.
 Rataj, K. 1975. Revision of the genus Cryptocoryne Fischer Studie CSAV, c.3.Praha.
 Wit, H.C.D.de 1958. Cryptocoryne wendtii sp.nov. Meded.Bot.tuinen en het Belmonte arboretum WAG Vol.II-4 : 97-101.
 Wit, H.C.D.de 1990. Aquarienpflanzen, 2. Auflage Ulmer, Stuttgart.

References

External links
 Crypts pages C. wendtii
 several photographs
 Cryptocoryne wendtii var. krauteri
 Cultivation notes
 red form notes
 Tropica tropica form
 Tropica green form
 Paghat's Garden notes
 Mi Oya form

wendtii
Aquatic plants